Life and Debt is a 2001 American documentary film directed by Stephanie Black. It examines the economic and social situation in Jamaica, and specifically how the International Monetary Fund and the World Bank's structural adjustment policies have impacted the island.

Content
Life and Debt is a 2001 United States documentary film directed by Stephanie Black about the economic and social situation in Jamaica, and specifically the impact of International Monetary Fund (IMF) and the World Bank's policies. It starts with the essay "A Small Place" by Jamaica Kincaid.
The IMF loans were conditional on structural adjustment policies, which required Jamaica to enact major economic reforms, including trade liberalization, privatization, and deregulation. Reforms were not successful and left Jamaica with $4.6 billion in debt.
The film features a number of interviews with former Jamaican Prime Minister Michael Manley, in which he critiques the system of International Financial Institution loans. He is particularly critical of required structural adjustments as an attack on the sovereignty of many former colonial nations and suggests the system is akin to imperialism or neocolonialism.

Cast
  Michael Manley
  Jamaica Kincaid
 Buju Banton
  Horst Kὅhler
  Bill Clinton
  Stanley Fischer
  Yami Bolo
 Jerry Rawlings
  Michael Witter
  David Coore
  Jean-Bertrand Aristide
  Belinda Becker

Soundtrack

Awards
 2004 FESTIVAL INTERNATIONAL DU FILM INSULAIRE, OLE DE GROIX, SPECIAL JURY PRIZE
 2004 PARIS HUMAN RIGHTS FILM FESTIVAL, SPECIAL JURY PRIZE.
 CINEAMBIENTE INT. ENVIRONMENTAL FILM FEST. 2002 TEEN JURY BEST FILM OF FESTIVAL, TURIN, ITALY
 ONE WORLD 2002-PRAGUE HUMAN RIGHTS FILM FESTIVAL-AUDIENCE AWARD BEST FILM OF THE FESTIVAL
 ONE WORLD MEDIA AWARDS-FINALIST, INTERNATIONAL PREMIER AWARD, ENGLAND
 BEST DOCUMENTARY AT THE JAMERICAN FILM  FESTIVAL.
 CRITICS JURY AWARD, HONORABLE MENTION "BEST  FILM OF THE FESTIVAL"  INDEPENDENT FEATURE PROJECT/WEST LOS ANGELES FILM FESTIVAL

Reviews

Roger Ebert, a film critic for the Chicago Sun-Times, gave the movie a three out of four-star rating and described it as "a harsh indictment, but persuasive".

On Rotten Tomatoes the film has an approval rating of 90% based on reviews from 42 critics.

On June 15, 2001, Stephen Holden of The New York Times, wrote a review titled "ILM REVIEW; One Love, One Heart, Or a Sweatshop Economy?", in which he describes the film as a powerful documentary. He says that "The movie offers the clearest analysis of globalization and its negative effects that I've ever seen on a movie or television screen".

On February 26, 2003, Jamie Russell from the BBC gave it a four out of five-star rating and described the movie as brilliant. She explains that Stephanie Black's hits toward the tourism industry and lack of options to change the situation leaves audiences with nothing more than simply being angry about everything.

On March 25, 2003, Andrew Pulver of The Guardian gave it four out of five stars. He stressed the importance of the movie and explained that anyone with any interest in globalization should watch it. He describes it as "a detailed, poignant examination of Jamaica's parlous economic plight".

 
 
 
 Life and Debt on Google Video
 'Documentarian shoots from the hip inside Jamaica's debtor's prison' - interview with the director, Stephanie Black, on Japan Times Online

References

2001 films
2001 documentary films
American documentary films
Works about debt
Films based on non-fiction books
International Monetary Fund
World Bank
Economy of Jamaica
Films shot in Jamaica
Films set in Jamaica
Documentary films about economics
Films about privatization
Works about the World Bank
Works about the International Monetary Fund
2000s English-language films
2000s American films